Junior Order United American Mechanics Children's Home, DBA American Children's Home, is a historic Junior Order of United American Mechanics orphanage located near Lexington, Davidson County, North Carolina. The complex was designed by architect Herbert B. Hunter and consists of five major buildings built between 1925 and 1932.  The complex is modeled after the University of Virginia. The Colonial Revival style buildings include Administration Building (1927), the Pennsylvania Building ("Pioneer Cottage"), the South Carolina Building (now the Children's Emergency Shelter), the North Carolina Building, and the Samuel F. Vance Auditorium (1932).

It was added to the National Register of Historic Places in 1984.

References

Orphanages in North Carolina
School buildings on the National Register of Historic Places in North Carolina
Colonial Revival architecture in North Carolina
School buildings completed in 1932
Buildings and structures in Davidson County, North Carolina
National Register of Historic Places in Davidson County, North Carolina
1932 establishments in North Carolina